The Neon God: Part 1 – The Rise, is the eleventh studio album and the first act of a two-part rock opera by the American heavy metal band  W.A.S.P. The songs on the album narrate the story of an abused and orphaned boy named Jesse, who finds that he has the ability to read and manipulate people. The second part was released on the album titled The Neon God: Part 2 - The Demise.

Track listing

Personnel
W.A.S.P.
Blackie Lawless – vocals, guitars, bass, keyboards, drums, producer
Darrell Roberts – lead guitar, vocals, drums
Mike Duda – bass, vocals
Frankie Banali – drums, percussion
Stet Howland – drums (track 3)

Production
Wesley M. Seidman – mixing
Tom Baker – mastering
Kosh – art direction and design

Charts

References

External links
http://www.waspnation.com/neonstory.htm

W.A.S.P. albums
2004 albums
Albums produced by Blackie Lawless
Rock operas
Sanctuary Records albums
Noise Records albums